Lieutenant General John Mugume is a senior Ugandan military officer. He currently serves as the General Manager of Defence Forces Shop Limited, the duty-free commissary of the UPDF.

Background
He was born in the Western Region of Uganda. He was one of the first 100 recruits into the National Resistance Army. His military number in RO/00087, being the 87th recruit.

Military career
Among the roles he has served in, are the following:
 As General Manager of Defence Forces Shop, effective March 2008, at the rank of Brigadier.
 As Chief of Military Police, prior to 2008.
 As Commander of the 5th Division of the UPDF, prior to 2008.
 As Uganda's Military Attaché in Tanzania, prior to 2008.

In February 2019, in a promotions exercise involving over 2,000 men and women of the UPDF, he was promoted from the rank of Major General, to that of Lieutenant General.

See also
 Uganda People's Defence Forces

References

External links
New guard takes charge of UPDF in new changes

People from Western Region, Uganda
People from Mbarara District
Living people
Ugandan military personnel
Year of birth missing (living people)
Ugandan generals